Satan's Brew is a 1976 German film directed by Rainer Werner Fassbinder.

Plot 
fThe poet Walter Kranz and his practical wife Luise live with Walter's mentally disabled brother Ernst. They have money problems, as the formerly successful "poet of the revolution" has not written anything in two years. His bank account is overdrawn, his publisher refuses to give him an advance, and he has already accumulated too many debts with his friends Lisa and Rolf. One of Walter's mistresses, Irmgard von Witzleben, writes him a check, but he accidentally shoots her while roleplaying with a gun. 

Walter gets the idea to write about a prostitute and begins to interview Lana von Meyerbeer, but finds it easier to sleep with her than to ask good questions. His wife watches and complains that he has not slept with her in 17 days. Meanwhile his brother Ernst is busy increasing his collection of dead flies. While a policeman comes to ask for Walter's alibi for the murder, some movers come to repossess his furniture. Because it has become so uncomfortable at home, Walter prefers to stay with his lover Lisa, whose husband doesn't mind. Lisa agrees to give an alibi. 

In search of money, Walter sends for his admirer Andrée, who has been writing letters to him for years. She is happy to move in with Walter, Luise, and Ernst. Andrée makes all her savings available to him, is completely devoted to Walter, and lets herself be repeatedly humiliated by him. She is even raped in the coal cellar by Ernst at Walter's suggestion. 

Walter writes a beautiful poem, which his wife quickly realizes he has plagiarized from Stefan George. Walter uses Andrée's money to have a Wilhelmian era suit tailored, puts on a wig, andlike Georgebegins to read his texts to a small group of followers. He identifies more and more with George, only his appearance troubles him, as Luise has pointed out that Walter is much too fat to be Stefan George. 

When Andrée's savings run out, Walter's audience also fails to return, because he was paying them to attend his lectures. With the exception of Andrée, Walter's only remaining disciple is a young man named Urs, who promises to bring his brother. When Luise points out that Stefan George was a homosexual, Walter goes cruising in a men's toilet. He meets a male prostitute, but is unable to go through with having gay sex, and the prostitute proves incapable of assisting with his readings. Walter declares Stefan George to be dead, but remains interested in the Friedrich Nietzsche-inspired worldview of the superman and the weak.

The lack of money drives Walter to visit his aging parents, whom he manages to con out of their meager funeral savings. Andree, who follows him every step of the way, is shocked to find out Walter's parents are not as wealthy and educated as he'd made it seem.

Soon, Walter's creative crisis is over: he is writing again and reading to Andree and his two disciples. However, he still lacks money, which brings him to surprise the prostitute Lana in her apartment. When he realizes that she is married, he uses blackmail to demand her savings. But he did not expect Lana's protectors, who savagely beat him up in front of Andree. When Walter, still lying on the ground, smiles, Andree takes this to mean he is weak and completely renounces her belief in him.

Walter doesn't care, because he's made it: his book No Celebration for the Führer’s Dead Dog is finished and the publisher is satisfied: it is now "no more cramped left kitsch", but has "power" and "size". He suggests an advertising slogan: "An epic from the lowlands and sewers of human existence." Walter returns home to find out his wife has been hospitalized. All this time, he had never paid attention to her appearance or her comments on her health. When he arrives at the hospital with the two remaining disciples, Luise has already died. He collapses theatrically, disappointing the disciples, before whom Walter has always sworn to be strong.

He declares everything to be acting to the doctor. Upon hearing about his new work, he calls Walter lucky, which makes him smile. Now, Walter decides to get rid of his brother and accuses Ernst of the murder of Irmgard to get the police off his trail. He also tells Ernst to get the pistol from its hiding place, but Ernst shoots him while he is talking to the police. When the doorbell rings, the police are standing in front of the door with Irmgard. They pour a bucket of cold water over him and let him stand up again. Walter asks them, irritated, "Is this paradise?"

Cast 
 Kurt Raab : Walter Kranz
 Margit Carstensen - Andrée
 Helen Vita - Luise Kranz
 Volker Spengler - Ernst Kranz
 Ingrid Caven - Lisa
 Marquard Bohm - Rolf
 Y Sa Lo - Lana von Meyerbeer
 Ulli Lommel - Lauf
 Brigitte Mira - Mrs. Kranz
 Katherina Buchhammer - Irmgart von Witzleben
 Armin Meier - Hustler

External links

1976 drama films
1976 films
German drama films
German black comedy films
German satirical films
West German films
Films about writers
Narcissism in fiction
1970s German films